The Zvenigorodsky seal, sometimes dubbed "Persian king and the defeated enemies", is an Achaemenid cylinder seal made from chalcedony, and housed in the Hermitage Museum of Saint Petersburg, Russia (inv.no. Гл-501) since 1930, when it was acquired from a private collection. It is the so-called "Zvenigorodsky seal", it was acquired in Kerch, and first appears in the 1881 Compte rendu de la Commission Impériale Archéologique pour l'Année 1881.

Content
The cylinder depicts an Achaemenid King of Kings holding a kneeling captive with a hand, and subjugating him with a spear held by the other hand. The kneeling captive wears an Egyptian crown. Behind the king there are four prisoners with a rope around their necks, the rope being held by the king himself. Their garment is similar to that of the Egyptians seen on the reliefs of Naqsh-e Rostam. The scene therefore refers to Ancient Egypt and to an act of conquest or the suppression of a rebellion by an Achaemenid king. It is generally thought that the seal depicts a Persian king or hero thrusting his lance at an Egyptian pharaoh, while holding four other captives on a rope.

Identification
All the characters on the cylinder are unnamed, thus making difficult to identify at least the two main figures. The Hermitage Museum indeed does not give any identification, yet it dates the seal to the late 5th–early 4th century BCE.
Nevertheless, several attempts to identify at least the Achaemenid ruler were made. In 1903, Gaston Maspero suggested that the scene depicts Darius the Great (r. 522–486 BCE) dealing with some rebels. In 1940, Richard Arthur Martin believed that the two rulers were Artaxerxes I (r. 465–424 BCE) and the defeated Inaros II.
In 1979, Muhammad Dandamayev opted for Artaxerxes II (r. 405/4–359/8 BCE). In 1992, Shapur Shahbazi suggested without certainty that the ruler could have been "Artaxerxes (III?)" (r. 359/8–338 BCE).

Similar seals
An almost identical scene appears on another chalcedony cylinder, held by the Metropolitan Museum of Art (Acc. No. 1999.325.114), but with an earlier dating (6th–5th century BCE). There too, there are no inscriptions that could help identify the characters.

A rather similar seal is known bearing the inscription "I am Artaxerxes the Great King" in cuneiform (the "Moscow Artaxerxes Cylinder Seal"): the Achaemenid king is shown leading the Egyptian captives on a rope, but the kneeling figure of the pharaoh is absent and replaced by the Old Persian cuneiform inscription. The inscription would suggest that the king in the seal is either Artaxerxes III, who reconquered Egypt, or more probably Artaxerxes I, who did put down a rebellion in Egypt, given the rather rigid execution of the engraving, which suggests an early date for its manufacture, probably closer to the time of Darius the Great.

The seal has many similarities with the seal of Darius the Great, both in the rather rigid treatment of the figures, and in the composition of the seal itself. On these grounds, the manufacture of the Zvenigorodsky seal could be attributed to a period rather close to that of Darius, which would favour an attribution to Artaxerxes I.

References

Bibliography

Cylinder and impression seals in archaeology
Sculptures of the Hermitage Museum
Archaeology of the Achaemenid Empire
5th-century BC sculptures
4th-century BC sculptures
Achaemenid Egypt